Something in Common is an album by saxophonist Houston Person and bassist Ron Carter that was released by Muse in 1989.

Reception

At AllMusic Scott Yanow noted, "Houston Person is one of the last in a long line of thick-toned tenors who display soul in every note they play while bassist Ron Carter's versatility is legendary (it seems as if he has spent half of his life in recording studios). Their duet CD, although not inevitable, works out quite well...the main attractions of this date are the instrumentation and the strong interplay between Person and Carter".

Track listing 
 "Once in a While" (Michael Edwards, Bud Green) – 7:07
 "Anthropology" (Dizzy Gillespie, Charlie Parker) – 6:02
 "Blues for Two" (Valery Ponomarev) – 8:42
 "Mack the Knife" (Kurt Weill, Bertolt Brecht) – 6:22
 "Joy Spring" (Clifford Brown) – 5:37
 "Blue Seven" (Sonny Rollins) – 5:57
 "I Thought About You" (Jimmy Van Heusen, Johnny Mercer) – 3:48	
 "Good Morning Heartache" (Irene Higginbotham, Ervin Drake, and Dan Fisher) – 7:26

Personnel 
Houston Person – tenor saxophone 
Ron Carter – double bass

References

Houston Person albums
Ron Carter albums
1990 albums
Muse Records albums
Albums recorded at Van Gelder Studio